In My Own Time is the second and final studio album by Karen Dalton, released by Paramount Records in 1971. The album was produced by Harvey Brooks and was the last of Dalton's work to be released before her death in 1993. In My Own Time was reissued by Light in the Attic in 2006.

Reception

Writing for AllMusic, Thom Jurek praised the album "a more polished effort than her cozy, somewhat more raw debut... If one can only possess one of Karen Dalton's albums, In My Own Time is the one. It creates a sound world that is simply unlike any other; it pushes the singer outside her comfort zone and therefore brings listeners to the place Dalton actually occupied as a singer. Without apology or concern for technique, she could make any song her own, creating a personal narrative that could reach outside the song itself, moving through her person and becoming the truth for the listener." Steven M. Deusner of Pitchfork Media wrote the album "reveals a demanding, intuitive, eccentric singer and arranger who never sang her own words but clearly and confidently expressed herself with others'."

Track listing
"Something on Your Mind" (Dino Valenti) – 3:23
"When a Man Loves a Woman" (Calvin Lewis, Andrew Wright) – 2:59
"In My Own Dream" (Paul Butterfield) – 4:18
"Katie Cruel" (Traditional; arranged by Karen Dalton) – 2:22
"How Sweet It Is (To Be Loved by You)" (Lamont Dozier, Brian Holland, Eddie Holland) – 3:43
"In a Station" (Richard Manuel) – 3:52
"Take Me" (George Jones, Leon Payne) – 4:40
"Same Old Man" (Traditional; arranged by Steve Weber) – 2:45
"One Night of Love" (Joe Tate) – 3:19
"Are You Leaving for the Country" (Richard Tucker) – 3:14

Personnel
Karen Dalton – vocals, banjo, 12-string guitar, arrangements
Richard Bell – piano
Harvey Brooks – bass, arrangements, Album Producer
Amos Garrett – guitar
John Hall – guitar solo on "In My Own Dream"
Daniel Hanken – guitar
Bill Keith – pedal steel guitar
Ken Pearson – organ
Denny Seiwell – drums
John Simon – piano
Greg Thomas – drums
Dennis Whitted – drums
Bobby Notkoff – violin
Hart McNee – tenor saxophone
Robert Fritz – clarinet
Marcus Doubleday – trumpet

References

Karen Dalton (singer) albums
1971 albums
Paramount Records (1969) albums
Albums produced by Harvey Brooks